is a railway station in the city of Ichinomiya, Aichi Prefecture, Japan, operated by Meitetsu.

Lines

Station layout
The station has two elevated island platform, with the station building underneath.  The station has automated ticket machines, Manaca automated turnstiles and is staffed. The station is physically joined to JR Central's Owari-Ichinomiya Station.

Platforms

Adjacent stations

Station history
It was renamed Meitetsu-Ichinomiya on 29 January 2005. The station was reopened as an elevated station on 21 February 1993.

Passenger statistics
In fiscal 2016, the station was used by an average of 17,700 passengers daily.

Surrounding area
Meitetsu department store
Masumida Shrine
National Route 155
Shubun University.

See also
 List of Railway Stations in Japan

References

External links

 Official web page 

Railway stations in Japan opened in 1900
Railway stations in Aichi Prefecture
Stations of Nagoya Railroad
Ichinomiya, Aichi